First Class Kloss! is an album by saxophonist Eric Kloss which was recorded in 1967 and released on the Prestige label.

Reception

Allmusic awarded the album 4 stars.

Track listing 
All compositions by Eric Kloss, except as indicated
 "Comin' Home Baby" (Bob Dorough, Ben Tucker) - 2:39  
 "The Chasin' Game" - 7:00  
 "One for Marianne" - 6:42  
 "Chitlins con Carne" (Kenny Burrell) - 2:51  
 "Walkin'" (Richard Carpenter) - 5:24  
 "African Cookbook" (Randy Weston) - 6:47

Personnel 
Eric Kloss - alto saxophone, tenor saxophone
Jimmy Owens - trumpet 
Cedar Walton - piano
Leroy Vinnegar - bass
Alan Dawson  - drums

References 

1967 albums
Eric Kloss albums
Prestige Records albums
Albums produced by Don Schlitten